Porpidia is a genus of crustose lichens in the family Lecideaceae.

Taxonomy
Porpidia was circumscribed by the German lichenologist Gustav Wilhelm Körber in 1855, with Porpidia trullisata designated as the type species.

Species

, Species Fungorum accepts 38 species of Porpidia:
Porpidia albocaerulescens 
Porpidia cinereoatra 
Porpidia contraponenda 
Porpidia crustulata 
Porpidia degelii 
Porpidia flavicunda 
Porpidia flavocruenta  - Austria, the British Isles, Scandinavia, Iceland, and North America (Alaska)
Porpidia grisea 
Porpidia hydrophila 
Porpidia hypostictica  – China
Porpidia irrigua 
Porpidia islandica  - Scotland and Iceland
Porpidia littoralis  – Australia
Porpidia lowiana 
Porpidia macrocarpa 
Porpidia melinodes 
Porpidia nadvornikiana 
Porpidia navarina  – Chile
Porpidia ochrolemma 
Porpidia pachythallina  - British Isles
Porpidia platycarpoides 
Porpidia rugosa 
Porpidia shangrila  – China
Porpidia soredizodes 
Porpidia speirea 
Porpidia squamosa  – China
Porpidia stephanodes 
Porpidia striata  - British Isles
Porpidia submelinodes  – Antarctica
Porpidia subsimplex 
Porpidia superba 
Porpidia thomsonii 
Porpidia trullisata 
Porpidia tuberculosa 
Porpidia ulleungdoensis  – Ulleungdo, South Korea
Porpidia umbonifera 
Porpidia vulcanoides 
Porpidia zeoroides 

In addition, one additional species is accepted by Mycobank:
Porpidia seakensis  – Alaska

References

Lecideales
Lecideales genera
Lichen genera
Taxa named by Gustav Wilhelm Körber
Taxa described in 1855